The Humps is a granite rock formation known as a "stepped bornhardt inselberg".

Approximately  to its south is Hyden Rock whose northern side features the Wave Rock formation.

Mulka's Cave

On the north-eastern edge of The Humps is Mulka's Cave, also known as Bate's Cave. The cave contains Aboriginal rock art comprising over 450 hand prints and images. Most sites of Aboriginal art in the region contain fewer than 30 motifs. While visitation has damaged the site, mitigation strategies put into place appear to have arrested further damage.  Mulka's Cave is protected under the Aboriginal Heritage Act. It is also both a Protected Area and listed on the Register of the National Estate.

Walks
The Humps Nature Reserve has two marked walking trails.

Reservoir
Water run-off from The Humps is directed into the Hyden Humps Dam reservoir.

See also 
 Granite outcrops of Western Australia
 List of protected areas of Western Australia

References 

Rock formations of Western Australia
Monoliths of Australia